Tia Lessin is an American documentary filmmaker. Lessin has produced and directed documentaries and earned an Academy Award nomination for Best Documentary and the Sundance Grand Jury Prize for Documentary.

She co-directed the film The Janes which had its premiere at the 2022 Sundance Film Festival and is the director and producer, with Carl Deal, of Trouble the Water and Citizen Koch. She directed Behind the Labels and produced several of Michael Moore's films including Fahrenheit 9/11, Where to Invade Next and Fahrenheit 11/9.

Career
Tia Lessin is producer and director, together with Carl Deal, of the Academy Award-nominated feature documentary Trouble the Water, winner of the Gotham Independent Film Award and the Sundance Film Festival’s Grand Jury Prize for best documentary. Lessin was a co-producer of Michael Moore's Where to Invade Next, Capitalism: A Love Story, Fahrenheit 9/11, winner of the Palme d'Or, and the supervising producer of Academy Award-winning Bowling for Columbine.

Lessin received the Sidney Hillman Prize for Broadcast Journalism for her documentary Behind the Labels. She line produced Martin Scorsese's No Direction Home: Bob Dylan and was consulting producer for his Living in the Material World: George Harrison. She began her career as associate producer of Charles Guggenheim's Oscar-nominated short film Shadows of Hate.

In television, Lessin's work as producer of the series The Awful Truth earned her two Emmy Award nominations and one arrest.

Lessin is a Sundance Institute Fellow, an Open Society Institute Katrina Media Fellow, a Creative Capital grantee and was awarded the Women of Worth "Vision" Award by L’Oréal Paris and Women in Film.

On February 6th, 2023 Tia Lessin and co director Emma Pildes won the Alfred I. duPont-Columbia Award’s Silver Baton for their 2022 HBO documentary 'The Janes'. The Alfred I. duPont–Columbia University Awards honor outstanding public service audio and video reporting in television, radio and digital journalism.

Awards and recognitions

 Winner, Alfred I. duPont-Columbia Awards, 2023
 Academy Award nominee, Best Documentary Feature, 2008
 Winner, Grand Jury Prize, Sundance Film Festival
 Winner, Grand Jury Prize, Full Frame Film Festival
 Winner, Gotham Independent Film Award
 Emmy Award nominee, producer of Outstanding Informational program: long form, 2010
 Emmy Award nominee, Outstanding Individual Achievement in a Craft: Research, 2010
 Nominee, Producers Guild of America Award, best non fiction producer 2008
 Nominee, NAACP Image Award, 2008
 Council On Foundations Henry Hampton Award for Excellence In Film And Digital Media, 2009
 Harry Chapin Media Award for Film, 2009
 Winner, Sidney Hillman Prize for Broadcast Journalism
 Women of Worth Vision Award by L'Oréal Paris and Women in Film.
 Emmy Award Nominee, producer of Outstanding Non-Fiction Series, 2000–2001
 Emmy Award Nominee, producer of Outstanding Non-Fiction Series, 1998–1999
 Creative Capital grantee
 Sundance Institute Fellow
 Open Society Institute Katrina Media Fellow

Filmography

Feature films and documentaries 
The Janes (2022), director
Fahrenheit 11/9 (2018), executive producer
Where to Invade Next (2016), producer
 Citizen Koch (2013), director & producer 
 Living in the Material World: George Harrison (2011), co-executive producer
 Capitalism: A Love Story (2009), co-producer
 Trouble the Water (2008), director & producer 
 No Direction Home: Bob Dylan (2005), line producer
 Fahrenheit 9/11 (2004), producer
 Bowling for Columbine (2002), supervising producer
 Behind the Labels (2002), producer & director
 The Big One (1997), coordinating producer
 Shadows of Hate (1995), associate producer

Television 
 The Awful Truth (1999, 2000), producer
 TV Nation: Volume One & Two (1997), associate producer

References

External links

Trouble the Water Official Site

American documentary film directors
American documentary film producers
Living people
Place of birth missing (living people)
Year of birth missing (living people)